The 1993 Mid-Continent Conference men's basketball tournament was held March 7–9, 1993, at Wright State University in Fairborn, Ohio.
This was the tenth edition of the tournament for the Association of Mid-Continent Universities, now known as the Summit League. The winner of this tournament would go on receive a birth to the 1993 NCAA Division I men's basketball tournament, often referred to as NCAA March Madness, later that month.

Bracket

References

1992–93 Mid-Continent Conference men's basketball season
Summit League men's basketball tournament
1993 in sports in Ohio